This is a list of transfers in Serbian football for the 2011 summer transfer window.
Only moves featuring a Serbian SuperLiga side are listed.
The order by which the clubs are listed is equal to the classification of the SuperLiga at the end of the previous season, 2010–11.

The transfer window in Serbia opened on June 20, 2011.

Serbian SuperLiga

Partizan Belgrade

In:

Out:

Red Star Belgrade

In:

Out:

FK Vojvodina

In:

Out:

Rad Beograd

In:

Out:

Spartak ZV Subotica

In:

Out:

Sloboda Sevojno

In:

Out:

OFK Beograd

In:

Out:

Javor Ivanjica

In:

Out:

Borac Čačak

In:

Out:

FK Smederevo

In:

Out:

BSK Borča

In:

Out:

FK Jagodina

In:

Out:

Hajduk Kula

In:

	

Out:

Metalac G.M.

In:

Out:

Radnički 1923 Kragujevac

In:

Out:

FK Novi Pazar

In:

Out:

See also
Serbian SuperLiga
2011–12 Serbian SuperLiga

References
 SuperLiga licensed players lists at SuperLiga official website (Attention: some clubs and players missing)
 2011 summer transfers at Utakmica.rs
 Online news from Sportski žurnal
 Sportske.net information agency
 B92 information agency
 Sportal.rs information agency
 M:) Mondo information agency

Regional transfers:
  Macedonian First League 2011 summer transfers at MacedonianFootball.com
  Montenegrin First League 2011 summer transfers at CGfudbal

2011
Serbian SuperLiga
transfers